Osweiler is a small town in the commune of Rosport, in eastern Luxembourg.  , the town has a population of 369.

Rosport
Towns in Luxembourg